Poldark is a British historical drama television series based on the novels of the same title by Winston Graham and starring Aidan Turner in the lead role. The series was written and adapted by Debbie Horsfield for the BBC, and directed by several directors throughout its run. Set between 1781 and 1801, the plot follows the titular character on his return to Cornwall after the American War of Independence in 1783. 

The series first aired on BBC One in the United Kingdom on 8 March 2015 in eight parts, and in seven parts on PBS in the United States, which supported the production, on 21 June 2015 as part of its Masterpiece anthology. The first series was based on the first two Poldark novels by Graham. It is the second screen adaptation of Graham's novels, following a television series broadcast by BBC One between 1975 and 1977.

Series overview

Episodes

Series 1 (2015)

Series 2 (2016)

Series 3 (2017)

Series 4 (2018)

Series 5 (2019)

References 

Lists of British drama television series episodes